Noel Smith may refer to:

 Noel M. Smith (1895–1955), American film director and writer
 Noel Smith (footballer) (1918–2008), Australian rules footballer